Aaron B. Koontz is an American producer, writer and director. He is the founder and CEO of Paper Street Pictures, a boutique genre production outlet in Austin, Texas. He is also the creative force behind The Pale Door, the Scare Package franchise and is the lead producer for Shelby Oaks from YouTuber Chris Stuckmann.

Life and career

Koontz was born in Indianapolis, Indiana, and has been a cinephile his entire life, shooting home movies as a child and writing numerous short stories at a very young age. After moving to Florida with his family he went on to attend Full Sail University, where he was a  classmate of  filmmakers Adam Wingard and E.L. Katz. Koontz graduated in 2001 and worked freelance crew on various film sets including  Monster and studio films The Punisher and Out of Time.

In 2003 Koontz took a nearly ten-year detour where he worked in video game production as a producer and QA tester-manager for companies like EA Sports, THQ and Zynga.

In 2012 Koontz left games to start the boutique genre production company Paper Street Pictures. Through Paper Street, Koontz wrote and directed multiple short films including the award-winning Honor Student. In 2014 Koontz was executive producer of the SXSW hit Starry Eyes, and then in 2016 he co-wrote, produced and directed his first feature film, Camera Obscura, for NBC Universal. In 2019 Koontz lead the production team for the Shudder cult hit Scare Package, of which he also was the core story co-writer and director as well as the final segment director with Horror Hypothesis. In 2020 Aaron co-wrote, directed and produced The Pale Door, a horror-western he released with the help of executive producer Joe R. Lansdale.

In recent years Koontz has become one of the most prolific indie horror producers in North America. And In 2022 this was illustrated with five different releases he produced. Old Man starring Stephen Lang, came out in the fall followed by 'Blood Relatives' which premiered at Fantastic Fest and released Thanksgiving week.

The last film to release in 2022 that he produced was Scare Package 2: Rad Chad's Revenge of which he also was the core Director and Co-Writer as well as the Creator. The film premiered at Fright Fest in August before streaming exclusively on Shudder in December  which was called a 'superior and superbly silly sequel' from movieweb.

In 2023 he lead the production of Emily Hagins Sorry About the Demon which premiered in January, also on Shudder. And in March his latest production The Artifice Girl starring Lance Henriksen had its U.S. Premiere at SXSW. It previously won Best International Feature at Fantasia in Montreal and Trieste in Italy.

Additional upcoming horror and thriller films Aaron lead productions on include The Bunker, Trim Season, Snow Valley the Christmas creature feature 'A Creature Was Stirring' starring Chrissy Metz and Shelby Oaks which In March 2022 he launched a Kickstarter with Chris Stuckmann for their upcoming film, which went on to break the record as the most funded horror kickstarter of all-time and then began filming in May and June in and around Ohio.

In late 2020 it was announced that Koontz had formed a new genre consulting firm, Blood Oath, with various other industry veterans. Their motto is: "Making Scary Movies Less Scary to make".

Koontz has said that he hopes to make a third Scare Package film with Shudder, as he designed this as a trilogy.

Filmography

References

Living people
American film directors
Horror film directors
Year of birth missing (living people)